This is a partial list of lakes of Canada. Canada has an extremely large number of lakes, with the number of lakes larger than three square kilometres being estimated at close to 31,752 by the Atlas of Canada. Of these, 561 lakes have a surface area larger than 100 km2, including four of the Great Lakes. Almost 9% of Canada's total area is covered by freshwater. There is no official estimate of the number of smaller lakes.

Canada's largest lakes

Alberta

British Columbia

*

Manitoba

New Brunswick

Newfoundland and Labrador

Northwest Territories

Nova Scotia

Nunavut

Ontario

Quebec

Saskatchewan

Yukon

Kluane Lake is the largest lake in Yukon at  located at an elevation of

International lakes

This is a list of lakes shared between Canada and the United States.

 Lake Champlain in Quebec and New York, Vermont 
 Lake Erie in Ontario and Michigan, New York, Ohio, Pennsylvania 
 Lake Huron in Ontario and Michigan
 Lake Memphremagog in Quebec and Vermont 
 Lake Ontario in Ontario and New York
 Osoyoos Lake in British Columbia and Washington
 Rainy Lake in Ontario and Minnesota, 
 Lake St Clair in Ontario and Michigan 
 Lake Superior in Ontario and Michigan, Minnesota, Wisconsin 
 Waterton Lake in Alberta and Montana
 Lake of the Woods in Minnesota, Manitoba and Ontario

References

External links

Atlas of Canada – Lakes

 
 
Lakes